, who is also known by the mononym Utada, is a Japanese-American pop singer, songwriter and producer. By 2010, Utada had become one of the most influential, and best-selling, musical artists in Japan.

Born in the United States to Japanese parents, record producer Teruzane Utada and  singer Keiko Fuji, Utada began to write music and lyrics at an early age and often traveled to Tokyo as a result of her  father's job. Eventually, a recording contract with Toshiba-EMI was signed. Under the stage name Cubic U, she released an English-language debut album Precious in early 1998, but it was a commercial failure. In the following year, heavily influenced by R&B and dance-pop, a Japanese-language debut First Love was released and became an immediate success. Backed by the success of singles "Automatic", "Time Will Tell", and "Movin' On Without You", the album sold two million copies in its first week in Japan, topped the Oricon charts for six non-consecutive weeks and went on to sell six million more throughout the rest of 1999. First Love eventually became the country's best-selling album of all time. In 2021, Utada announced her non-binary gender identity, becoming one of the first public figures in Japan to self-identify in this way.

Utada's album Distance was released in early 2001 and spawned her biggest hit singles—"Addicted to You", "Wait & See (Risk)" and "Can You Keep a Secret?"—which became million-sellers. The album was commercially successful and broke several sales records after three million copies were sold in its first week of availability in Japan, instantly becoming the country's fastest-selling album. In 2002, backed by chart-topping singles such as "Traveling", "Hikari" and "Sakura Drops", Deep River, which incorporates elements of pop folk, was released and went on to become one of Japan's top-selling records of all-time. Subsequent full-length releases—Exodus, Ultra Blue and Heart Station—achieved million-selling status certified by the Recording Industry Association of Japan. After a prolonged hiatus, she released the acoustic-driven albums Fantôme and Hatsukoi, which reached number one on the Oricon album charts. She topped the charts again with 2022's Bad Mode, her first bilingual, Japanese/English album.

By the end of the 2000s, Utada was deemed "the most influential artist of the decade" in the Japanese music landscape by The Japan Times. Commercial success has made her one of Japan's top-selling recording artists of all time with over 50 million records sold since launching her career in the late 1990s. Twelve of her singles have reached number one on the Oricon Singles Chart, while ten albums have become chart-toppers. Six of her full-length releases are among the country's highest-selling albums of all time, including First Love, Distance and Deep River, which are among the top ten best-selling records of Japan's music history. She is best known by international audiences for writing and producing four theme-song contributions to Square Enix and Disney's collaborative video game series Kingdom Hearts: "Simple and Clean", "Sanctuary", "Don't Think Twice", and "Face My Fears".

Life and career

Early life and beginnings

Hikaru Utada was born in New York City as the only child of Teruzane Utada, a Japanese record producer, and his wife Junko, an  singer performing under the stage name Keiko Fuji. At the age of 10, Utada began to write music and lyrics. She made recordings with Keiko, releasing songs under a band named "U3" until 1996, when she started a solo project as Cubic U.

The first Cubic U single, "I'll Be Stronger", was released as a limited pressing in Japan in 1996. The next year, Utada started another project, releasing "Close to You", a cover of the Carpenters' song. She included it on her debut album Precious the following year. Both the album and single failed to chart on Oricon in Japan.

1998–2003: Japanese debut, First Love, Distance, and Deep River
Utada moved to Tokyo in the summer of 1998 and attended Seisen International School, and later the American School in Japan, while continuing to record on a contract with Toshiba-EMI. Early success came from Japanese FM radio. She was at the forefront of a new wave of singer-songwriters in Japan, branching out from the previously dominant idol singers. Leading up to the release of her Japanese debut album First Love, at the age of 15, she released two successful million-selling singles: "Automatic/Time Will Tell" and "Movin' On Without You". "Automatic/Time Will Tell" sold over two million copies. Backed by these singles, First Love went on to sell over 7 million units in Japan alone (with an additional 3 million overseas, bringing it to a sum of at least 10 million units), becoming the highest selling album in Japan's recent history. The album yielded the single "First Love", which peaked at the number 2 spot. By the end of the year, Utada was ranked 5th on Japanese radio station Tokio Hot 100 Airplay's Top 100 Artists of the 20th Century by the station and its listeners.

After a two-year break, Utada released the follow-up album Distance, garnering first-week sales of 3 million units. On the strength of its singles — "Addicted to You", "Wait & See (Risk)", "For You", "Time Limit", and "Can You Keep a Secret?" — Distance became the best-selling album of the year, with 4.47 million copies sold in Japan alone. Additionally, "Addicted to You" became her best-selling single, moving a million copies in its first week, the highest first week sales for a female solo artist, and staying on top of the chart for two consecutive weeks. "Wait & See: Risk" and "Can You Keep a Secret?" also were later ranked at number 6 and number 10 respectively on Oricon's list of 10 Best-Selling Singles from January 1, 1999, to April 24, 2006. Utada also went on to release a single, titled "Final Distance", which was dedicated to the female victim of a murder case in Ikeda, Osaka.

In 2001, Utada recorded the song "Blow My Whistle" for the action-comedy film Rush Hour 2. It was a collaboration with American rapper Foxy Brown, and was written by Utada alongside Pharrell Williams and Chad Hugo. The song is included on Def Jam's Rush Hour 2 soundtrack, which peaked the 11th spot on both the Billboard 200 and number 1 on the Top Soundtracks. While most of her work has been self-produced, Blow My Whistle was produced by the Neptunes.

Utada attended Columbia University in New York City starting in 2001. She attended for less than a year.

Leading up to the third album, Deep River, Utada released "Traveling", "Hikari", and "Sakura Drops/Letters"; all the songs reached the top of the charts. Before the release of the album, she underwent surgery after being diagnosed with a benign ovarian tumor. After recovering, she released Deep River and immediately went on promotional tours.

Deep River sold 2.35 million copies in its first week. Oricon reported that sales eventually surpassed 3.6 million, making Utada the only singer or group in Japanese music history to have three consecutive albums surpass the three-million mark, by RIAJ standards. It was her third consecutive album to reach number 1 on Oricon's Yearly Albums chart and became the eighth best selling album of all time in Japan.

In 2003, Utada's promotional and personal life schedules became more active due to her marriage and an agreement with Island Records in the United States to release a "proper" full-English debut album. "Colors" was her only single release for 2003.

2004–2005: Foray into international market, and Exodus

Utada's first singles compilation album Utada Hikaru Single Collection Vol. 1 was released on March 31, 2004. It became the best-selling album of 2004 in Japan, making her the only solo or group artist to reach number 1 four times on the yearly charts. It was the first compilation album to reach number 1 in six years on the yearly charts, and the first compilation album to reach number 1 in twenty-six years by a female artist. Despite its success, the album received little promotion and no new material; moreover, it charted longer on the Oricon Albums chart than any other Utada release to date (over two years). The album sold 2.58 million units in Japan, making it the 34th best-selling album ever in the country. A month later, on April 21, she released a lone Japanese single for 2004, "Dareka no Negai ga Kanau Koro", which topped the singles chart for two consecutive weeks and sold 365,000 units by the year's end. It was also the main theme song for Casshern, directed by her husband at the time, Kazuaki Kiriya.

In mid-2004, Utada moved back to New York, and began work on a recording contract with Island Def Jam Music Group. On October 5, 2004, she released a North American English-language debut album, Exodus, under the newly announced stage name "Utada". It was released on September 9 in Japan, with a special booklet and housed in a cardboard slipcase. In an MTV interview, she expressed skepticism about this American success: "I don't think it's the music that I'm concerned about. It's obviously that I look really different and there really aren't any completely Asian people [who are popular singers in the U.S.] right now." She also remarked on the album not being one that pandered to fans, but wanting to make it anyway. Exodus became her fourth consecutive release to debut at number 1 and boasted 500,000 copies in its first-week sales in Japan. American sales were not quite as successful: it reached number 160 in the US Billboard 200 chart; and peaked at number 5 in the Heatseekers chart. "Easy Breezy" was released as the lead single in early August 2004, followed up by "Devil Inside" six weeks later. Utada appeared on the cover of Interview magazine's June 2005 issue.

"Exodus '04" was released at the end of June 2005 and featured remixes from the Scumfrog, Richard Vission, JJ Flores and Peter Bailey. In the UK, Mercury added another two remixes for "You Make Me Want to Be a Man" in the original album, titled "You Make Me Want to Be a Man (Bloodshy & Avant Mix)" and "You Make Me Want to Be a Man (Junior Jack Mix)". By the end of the year, Utada was voted "Number 1 Favorite Artist of 2004" by Oricon's annual readers poll.

The fourth single from Exodus, "You Make Me Want to Be a Man", was released in October 2005 in the UK. "Devil Inside" became a club hit in the U.S. and topped the Billboard Hot Dance/Club Airplay charts. Both the Exodus album and the "You Make Me Want to Be a Man" single were released in the UK, with different artwork from the US and Japanese versions.

2005–2008: Return to Japan, Ultra Blue, and Heart Station
A year after the release of Exodus, Utada moved back to Tokyo and returned to the Japanese music scene. Leading up the release of a fourth album, Ultra Blue, she released a string of successful hit singles: "Colors" (number 1), "Dareka no Negai ga Kanau Koro" (number 1), "Be My Last" (number 1), "Passion" (number 4), and "Keep Tryin'" (number 2). The digital single "This Is Love" was released to promote the album, netting 1,000,000 downloads.

Ultra Blue sold 500,317 copies in the first week, lower than that of the previous album, although it still topped the Oricon Daily, Weekly, and Monthly charts. Ultra Blue was Utada's fifth consecutive chart-topping Japanese album (excluding the English-language Exodus) to sell in excess of 500,000 copies in the first week. On July 13, Toshiba EMI published a report stating that Ultra Blue had sold over one million copies worldwide and four million digital ringtones already making it one of EMI's 10 best-selling albums of the past year. The album, which did not contain much pop music, was met with mixed reception, although the album was certified Million by RIAJ. Additionally, it was the highest-selling original studio album by a Japanese female artist in 2006.

Ultra Blue later became available on the iTunes Japan online music store, charting at number 4 on the 2006 yearly download rankings. Two weeks after the release of Ultra Blue, she went on a nationwide tour titled Utada United 2006, from June 30 through September 12. This was her second concert tour after the Bohemian Summer 2000 tour.

The singles that were released prior to Utada's fifth studio album, Heart Station, were able to reach the Top Five position on the chart, including the number 1 hit "Flavor of Life", which would become the best selling digital single in Japan with over 7,500,000 copies downloaded. Around the same time, she visited New York to talk with producers and executives at Island/Def Jam about recording a second English album. Later in the year a digital track by American R&B artist Ne-Yo, titled "Do You" from his 2007 album Because of You, featured Utada and was released in Japan on November 21 (the song was later featured on Ne-Yo's "best of" album, Ne-Yo: The Collection, released on September 2, 2009, in Japan and November 2009 in the US).

On June 30, 2007, the British EMI Group, which had held a 55% stake in Toshiba EMI since before Utada's debut in Japan, purchased the remaining 45% stake from the Japanese Toshiba Corporation, therefore making Toshiba EMI a wholly owned subsidiary of the London-based record label. Toshiba EMI then changed its name to EMI Music Japan to reflect Toshiba's divestiture from the business. Utada's first single under the label, "Beautiful World"/"Kiss & Cry" was released as a double A-side single on August 29, 2007, and also reached number 1 on the Oricon Daily Chart. Beautiful World was used as the theme song for Evangelion 1.0: You Are (Not) Alone, the 2007 film reboot of the anime, Neon Genesis Evangelion, while Kiss & Cry was used in a series of commercials for Nissin Foods' Freedom Project advertising campaign starting April 20, 2007, and was previously released as a digital download on May 31, 2007.

The year 2007 ended with the single "Flavor of Life" becoming the best seller of 2007 and with Utada again voted "Number 1 Favorite Artist of 2007" by Oricon's annual readers poll, after a two-year absence from the top spot. She sold 12 million digital ringtones and songs in 2007, with "Flavor of Life" accounting for 7.5 million, the second-highest of any song worldwide that year. The single was featured as the main song in the second season of TV drama Hana yori Dango Returns.

Utada's fifth studio album, Heart Station, was released on March 19, 2008, becoming her fifth consecutive number-one Japanese studio album. Although it had collected the lowest first week sales for her career, with 480,081 copies sold, the sales of this album reached a million on the Oricon charts in January 2009, making it her first Japanese album to do so since the 2004 compilation album. It was given a certification of one million for shipments by the RIAJ. Heart Station became the best-selling digital-format album on the iTunes 2008 yearly album charts in Japan, and was also the highest-selling original studio album by a solo female artist on the Oricon Yearly Chart.

The song "Prisoner of Love" was used as the theme-song for the television drama Last Friends. Although "Prisoner of Love" was not initially released as a single alone, it reached number 1 in iTunes and the Chako-Uta charts after it was released as a single for the drama. It reached number 2 at the Oricon Weekly charts. It marked the fourth successful drama tie-in for Utada, following 1999's Majo no Jōken and First Love, 2001's Hero and Can You Keep a Secret and 2007's Hana Yori Dango and Flavor of Life.

On October 20, 2008, the song "Eternally" from Utada's 2001 album Distance was used as the theme for the drama Innocent Love. The song was later released as a digital single.

By the end of the year, Utada was also voted the "Number 1 Favorite Artist of 2008" by Oricon's annual readers poll for the second consecutive year, and third time overall.

2009–2010: Return to the US, and This Is the One

On December 16, 2008, information leaked onto the internet that Utada's next English-language single, titled "Come Back to Me", would be scheduled for airplay release through U.S. Rhythmic/Crossover and Mainstream formats on February 9 and 10, 2009 respectively via Island Records. Her second English album, titled This Is the One, was released on March 14, 2009, in Japan and on May 12, 2009, in the United States. This Is the One debuted at number 1 in Japan on March 13, 2009, the day it was released in Japan, but became her first album not to top the weekly chart since Precious. On March 30, 2009, Utada appeared on New York City radio station Z-100, the largest pop radio program in the U.S., and granted a live on-air interview on the station's Elvis Duran Morning Show, a breakthrough that would lead to a promotional schedule through the album's international physical release on May 12. She also sang the theme song for the second Evangelion film, Evangelion: 2.0 You Can (Not) Advance. The single was released on June 27, 2009, and is a remix of a previous single, "Beautiful World". The single is titled "Beautiful World -PLANiTb Acoustica Mix-".

On November 30, 2009, at Studio Coast, Tokyo, Utada sung a duet of Let It Snow with pop singer Mika.

On December 21, 2009, Utada's Dirty Desire remixes were released only on Amazon.com, Zune Marketplace, and the U.S. iTunes Store, in support of This Is the One and an upcoming tour. The tour, Utada: In the Flesh 2010, was her first concert tour outside Japan and included eight cities in the US and two dates in London, UK. The tickets for the second London performance went on public sale November 13, and reportedly sold out in just five hours.

2010–2015: Second return to Japan, Single Collection Vol. 2, Wild Life, and hiatus
In a personal blog post on August 9, 2010, Utada announced a long hiatus, writing "I don't know if it will be 2 years or 5 years." After having been focused on music from age 15 to 27, she expressed a need to have a broader range of experiences, and grow as a person.

However, she also wrote that before the hiatus began, some new music would be released. Soon after the post, a compilation album was announced: Utada Hikaru Single Collection Vol. 2, with a release date of November 24, 2010. This album would include all of Utada's Japanese singles, from "Dareka no Negai ga Kanau Koro" to "Prisoner of Love", on disc one, as well as an extra EP featuring five new tracks. Later it was announced a DVD containing the promotional video for Goodbye Happiness would be included in all first-press edition pre-orders.

On September 27, 2010, Utada revealed a single, entitled "Hymne à l'amour (Ai no Anthem)", which became a commercial tie-in for Pepsi NEX. The song features both Japanese and French lyrics, written and translated by Utada herself. She performed a concert series titled Wild Life at Yokohama Arena to promote the album, her first Japanese concert since 2006's Utada United.

On October 3, 2010, Utada's official EMI website was updated with the album artwork and final track list for Utada Hikaru Single Collection Vol. 2. First-press editions included a three-fold paper slip case, along with a  good luck charm, and a lottery slip for fans to have a chance at winning one of 1000 tickets to Wild Life.

In late October, it was revealed online at Tower Records Japan and several other websites that an English-language "best-of album" titled Utada the Best" would become available in Japan on the same day as Utada Hikaru Single Collection Vol. 2, November 24. Utada reacted to the news, stating: "I understand that if it doesn't sell, I'm the one who will take the hit, but to be honest, I don't want my fans putting down money for something that my heart isn't in." and "The release of Utada the Best is entirely against my will. I wish that my fans won't have to buy it. There's no new material in it."

Utada later announced a single, "Goodbye Happiness", with its accompanying PV appearing publicly on November 9, 2010. The song was also chosen as the Recochoku Chaku-Uta TV commercial theme song. She also appeared on a track entitled "London City" with English rapper Devlin on his first studio album, Bud, Sweat and Beers, which was also released on November 1.

On November 8, 2010, EMI Japan announced on its Web site that the company had made a global recording deal with Utada, also stating that all of her future work regardless of language would be released under one name: Hikaru Utada. This signaled the retirement of her Western stage name, Utada.

First-week sales for Utada Hikaru Single Collection Vol. 2 were 231,000 units according to Oricon. The release marked Utada's seventh consecutive number 1 album (5 original and two best-ofs) since her debut, surpassing KinKi Kids' previous record of six. On April 10, 2011, she won the award for "Best Conceptual Video" in the Space Shower Music Video Awards for the promotional video for "Goodbye Happiness", which was also her directorial debut.

The two-concert Wild Life tour took place on December 8 and 9, 2010 at Yokohama Arena. The opening concert was broadcast in 64 cinemas in Japan while it was simultaneously broadcast on Ustream, a live video streaming website. The two channels set up for the concert on Ustream were accessed a total of 925,000 times, with 345,000 unique viewers, which was a global record on Ustream.tv for the highest number of simultaneous accesses of any video, with the previous highest being only 100,000.

Japanese TV station NHK premiered a documentary about Utada on January 15, 2011, entitled , a documentary featuring studio performances ("Show Me Love (Not a Dream)" and "Goodbye Happiness") as well as a few clips from the Wild Life performances. It also featured a post–Wild Life interview with J-Wave host Chris Peppler, in which she expressed a desire to travel and do volunteer work overseas. She said she would continue writing music during the hiatus. The documentary was also broadcast internationally, in Europe on February 2, 2011, and in the US on February 12, 2011, on the NHK channel (TV Japan in America, and JSTV in Europe).

A DVD and Blu-ray release of Wild Life were confirmed and initially set for release on April 6, 2011. However, on March 24, 2011, Utada tweeted that both the DVD/Blu-ray of the Wild Life tour had been postponed, due to the earthquake and resulting tsunami in Japan damaging the pressing factories. The DVD was released on April 20, 2011, with the Blu-ray following.

On December 7, 2011, Recochoku updated their yearly download and awards chart, with her Utada Hikaru Single Collection Vol. 1 listed as the second-most-downloaded album of 2011.

On November 16, 2012, Utada's YouTube account uploaded a video entitled "桜流し" ("Sakura Nagashi", meaning "Flowing Cherry Blossoms"). The single was co-written with Paul Carter, and was digitally released on November 17, 2012. A DVD single was released a month later. "Sakura Nagashi" is the theme song from the animation movie Evangelion: 3.0 You Can (Not) Redo.

In September 2012, the British EMI group was broken up and sold to various companies. On April 1, 2013, Utada's record company, EMI Music Japan, was absorbed into Universal Music Japan, became defunct as a company and was renamed to EMI Records Japan. Therefore, all of her further releases before switching to Sony Music Entertainment Japan would be through Universal Music Japan.

On December 9, 2013, to celebrate the 15th anniversary of First Love, EMI Records released Utada: In the Flesh 2010 tour footage on iTunes and announced a re-release of First Love, including a special limited edition that contained the original album remastered, instrumentals from the original tracks, unreleased tracks and live footage from Utada's first live show, Luv Live.

On December 8, 2014, Universal Music Japan released a tribute album entitled Utada Hikaru no Uta. The album features cover versions of Utada's back catalogue of songs by different popular artists such as AI, Ayumi Hamasaki, Peabo Bryson, Ringo Shiina, and more.

On December 26, 2014, Universal Music Japan revealed through media outlet Weekly Bunshun that Utada only has one album left before the contract with the label ends, and that a comeback in the music industry was under discussion.

2015–2016: Parenthood and Fantôme
On July 3, 2015, Utada revealed the birth of a son on her blog, and mentioned work on an album primarily written during pregnancy. She asked for patience leading up to the release during the transition into parenthood.

In January 2016, it was reported that Utada would release a song in the spring. "Hanataba o Kimi ni" ("Bouquet for You") was the theme for the television show ), which aired on April 4, 2016. In February 2016, "Manatsu no Tōriame" was aired on April 4, 2016, to be the theme to a late-night TV station's news show, News Zero. That same day, Utada's website announced the official song's release, as digital singles, on April 15.

Utada's website was also updated with the announcement of a project titled "New-Turn", in which fans were encouraged to purchase her music and to use the hashtag "#おかえりHIKKI" ("Welcome Back Hikki") on Twitter. The aim was to use proceeds from the music purchased to plant more cherry blossom trees in the tsunami-damaged areas of Japan after the 2011 Tōhoku earthquake. The website also confirmed her return to artistic activities.

On August 8, 2016, the album's title, track list and cover were released. The album's title was announced as Fantôme (French: 'ghost'), containing eight new songs, as well as the previous three singles, for a track listing totaling eleven tracks. Following its release on September 28, Fantôme was commercially and critically successful. It debuted atop the Oricon Albums Chart and stayed there for four consecutive weeks, the most of any Utada studio album since First Love. It was awarded Album of the Year at the Japan Record Awards and received positive reviews from media outlets. At the end of the year, it was ranked the third-best-selling physical record of the year by Oricon, as well as the best-selling digital album, according to Billboard Japan.

2017–2019: Label transfer to Sony Music, Hatsukoi and tour
On February 9, 2017, it was announced that Utada would switch labels to Sony Music Japan sub-label Epic Records once the contract with Universal expired in March. The label announced that new material would be released later in 2017. The first digital single under the label, called "Ōzora de Dakishimete", was released digitally worldwide on July 10, 2017. The second one, called "Forevermore", was released on July 28. It features the drummer Chris Dave. A third digital single, called "Anata", was released on December 8. The song was chosen as the theme for the movie Destiny: Kamakura Monogatari. On December 8, she announced that the Japanese repertoire, from debut single Automatic to the sixth album Fantôme would be simultaneously available on all streaming services but Spotify, where it would be available a month later on January 8, 2018.

In 2018, Utada released a seventh Japanese album, the first under Epic, and embarked on a domestic tour, her first since 2006. She also co-produced the singer-songwriter Nariaki Obukuro's major label debut album, Bunriha no Natsu, under Epic. The first single off the album, "Lonely One", has Utada credited as a featured artist and was released on January 17, 2018, through streaming services.

On February 10, 2018, it was announced that Utada would provide the theme song for the video game Kingdom Hearts III, called "Chikai" ("Oath"), along the English version, called "Don't Think Twice", for international audiences. It was confirmed that "Chikai" would be included in her seventh Japanese album, set for release in 2018. A third studio collaboration with Obukuro was announced to be released in Sheena Ringo's tribute album, Adam to Eve no Ringo, a cover of Ringo's song "Marunouchi Sadistic", which they both covered one year earlier in Obukuro's radio show.

On April 17, 2018, a new single by Utada, "Hatsukoi", was unveiled in the drama Hana Nochi Hare ~Hanadan Next Season~ as an image song. It was the second song she delivered to the Hana Yori Dango drama series, after "Flavor of Life" in 2007. The single was released on May 30. On the next day, a single was announced for release on April 25 called "Play a Love Song", the theme song for Suntory Water SWITCH&SPARKLE.

On June 27, Utada's seventh Japanese album Hatsukoi was released. It contained all previous six singles, for a total of 12 songs. A domestic concert tour, called Hikaru Utada Laughter in the Dark Tour 2018 was held from November 6 until December 9 (which was her 20th debut anniversary day), for a total of 12 dates at 6 different venues. The album debuted at number 1 in Oricon physical and digital weekly charts, with total sales combined of over 242,000.

On September 28, it was reported that Utada would release a single titled "Face My Fears" as the theme song for Kingdom Hearts III. She co-produced the song with American musicians Skrillex and Poo Bear. "Face My Fears" was released as a CD single on January 18, 2019, making it her first release on the format in eleven years since her 2008 single "Prisoner of Love". It was also her first release with original English songs since This Is the One in 2009. The song became her first US Billboard Hot 100 at number 98, and it peaked at number 9 in Hot Dance/Electronic Songs chart.

On June 26, 2019, Utada's Laughter in the Dark tour film was released worldwide on Netflix, with English subtitles personally translated by the singer.

On November 1, 2019, an Utada collaboration with singer-songwriter Sheena Ringo was released, called "Roman to Soroban LDN ver." ("The Sun and the Moon", in English). It was featured in Sheena's best-of album Apple of Universal Gravity. An alternative version of the song, called "Roman to Soroban TYO ver.", was available on November 25. On November 27, 2019, Utada released the first single in over a year with "Shonen Jidai". It appears as track number 5 on the Inoue Yosue Tribute album. She also included a live rendition of the song on her 2003 DVD UH Live Streaming 20 Dai wa Ikeike!

2020–present: Bad Mode 

On May 8, 2020, Utada released "Time", the theme song for the NTV drama Bishoku Tantei Akechi Goro. The single "Darenimo Iwanai" was released on May 29 as the music for a Suntory mineral water campaign, with Utada starring in the commercial.

In the second episode of Instagram live series Jitaku Kakuri-chu no Hikaru Paisen ni Kike!, Utada confirmed that work was underway on both new Japanese and English songs for the next album, including English versions of the Japanese songs.

On December 3, 2020, it was announced that Takeru Sato and Hikari Mitsushima will star in a Netflix show based on Utada's songs "First Love" and "Hatsukoi". The streaming show, titled First Love Hatsukoi, is scheduled to be released in 2022.

On December 25, 2020, Utada's official website announced a new single titled "One Last Kiss" as the theme song for the film Evangelion: 3.0+1.0 Thrice Upon a Time. The song was later postponed 'until further notice' due to the COVID-19 pandemic, along with the movie. The single was released on March 8, 2021, with the release of the film.

Utada sang the theme "Pink Blood" for the 2021 anime To Your Eternity which was released in April. She released the single "Kimini Muchuu" for TBS drama series Saiai that November.

Bad Mode, Utada's eleventh studio album, was released on January 19, 2022. Her first bilingual album, Bad Mode includes collaborations with a variety of producers, including Skrillex and Poo Bear, A. G. Cook, and Sam Shepherd. The album reached number one on Japan's Oricon and Billboard charts.

On April 16, 2022, Utada performed at Coachella Valley Music and Arts Festival's main stage, her first time in a music festival in the United States, under the 88rising block. She sang a short setlist of old songs including "Simple and Clean", "Automatic", "First Love" and a new song, called T. A studio version of T, featuring rapper Warren Hue, was released in the same day after the concert finished, as part of the 88rising EP Head in the Clouds Forever.

On June 9, 2022, the concert "Hikaru Utada Live Sessions from Air Studios" was released for streaming on Netflix.

Musical style
Utada is a core component of the ever-changing J-pop music genre, bringing her American-inflected R&B vocal style to a mix of soulful ballads, bouncy dance-pop, and standard pop songs.

Utada's official website cites 16 musicians and composers as her favorite artists: Freddie Mercury, Cocteau Twins, Nine Inch Nails, Jimi Hendrix, Prince, Amel Larrieux, Édith Piaf, Chick Corea, the Blue Nile, Björk, Kate Bush, Akino Arai, Lenny Kravitz, Béla Bartók, Mozart, Jeff Buckley, Yutaka Ozaki, and Hibari Misora. Elsewhere, she has also listed R&B artists Aaliyah, Mariah Carey, and Mary J. Blige as inspirations, and has previously mentioned growing up as a fan of Madonna, Sting, and the Cure.

Personal life
Utada is bilingual and speaks English and Japanese fluently. On September 7, 2002, she married Kazuaki Kiriya, a photographer and film director who had directed several of her music videos. On March 2, 2007, the couple announced their divorce, citing personal changes and lack of communication due to the nature of their jobs.

On August 22, 2013, Utada's mother, Keiko Fuji, died by apparent suicide by jumping from the thirteenth floor of a 28-floor condominium building in Shinjuku, Tokyo.

On February 3, 2014, Utada announced plans to be wedded to an Italian man, asking for fans and the media to view their personal lives from a "respectable distance" as he was not in the entertainment industry. On the same day, ex-husband Kazuaki Kiriya congratulated her on the new marriage. On February 10, 2014, Utada and fiancé Francesco Calianno left a message on her official website explaining how they met each other while Calianno was a bartender in a London hotel, and asking for privacy. The couple were married on May 23, 2014. On July 3, 2015, the couple announced the birth of a son. On April 6, 2018, it was announced that they had divorced.

Utada has supported same-sex marriage; on June 26, 2021, she came out as non-binary in an Instagram livestream. Utada uses both she/her  and they/them pronouns. Utada also said in regards to the English language honorifics Ms. and Mrs., "It makes me uncomfortable to be identified so markedly by my marital status or sex, and I don't relate to any of those prefixes. Every time, I feel like I'm forced to misrepresent myself." Utada expressed support for such alternatives as Mx.

Discography

Japanese studio albums
 First Love (1999)
 Distance (2001)
 Deep River (2002)
 Ultra Blue (2006)
 Heart Station (2008)
 Fantôme (2016)
 Hatsukoi (2018)
 Bad Mode (2022)

English studio albums
 Precious (as Cubic U) (1998)
 Exodus (2004)
 This Is the One (2009)

Awards

See also

 Capitol Records
 List of artists who reached number one on the U.S. dance chart
 List of best-selling music artists in Japan
 List of number-one dance hits (United States)

Notes

References

External links

 
 
 
 
 

 
1983 births
20th-century Japanese women singers
21st-century Japanese women singers
American School in Japan alumni
Citizens of Japan through descent
Columbia University alumni
English-language singers from Japan
Japanese-language singers of the United States
EMI Music Japan artists
Island Records artists
Japanese dance musicians
Japanese electronic musicians
Japanese rhythm and blues singers
Japanese women in electronic music
Japanese LGBT singers
Japanese non-binary people
Living people
Mercury Records artists
Non-binary singers
Singers from New York City
Singers from Tokyo
Universal Music Japan artists
Video game musicians
Virgin Records artists
World Music Awards winners